Exotic may refer to:

Mathematics and physics
Exotic R4, a differentiable 4-manifold, homeomorphic but not diffeomorphic to the Euclidean space R4
Exotic sphere, a differentiable n-manifold, homeomorphic but not diffeomorphic to the ordinary n-sphere
Exotic atom, an atom with one or more electrons replaced by other negatively charged particles
Exotic hadron
Exotic baryon, bound states of 3 quarks and additional particles
Exotic meson, non-quark model mesons
Exotic matter, a hypothetical concept of particle physics

Music
"Exotic" (1963 song), a song by The Sentinals from the 1963 album Surf Crazy - Original Surfin' Hits
"Exotic" (Lil Baby song), 2018
"Exotic" (Priyanka Chopra song), a 2012 song by Priyanka Chopra featuring Pitbull

Flora and fauna
Exotic pet
Exotic Shorthair, a breed of cat
Exotic species (or introduced species), a species not native to an area

Other 
Exotic dancer, a type of dancer or stripper
Exotic derivative, a type of financial derivative

See also 
Exoticism
Exotica (disambiguation)